I Am 13 Years Old is a 1980 play by Merle Karusoo. This is the first of a series of plays representing Karusoo's 'memory theatre' based on documentary material.

The drama, set in deep Soviet occupation era of Estonia, was developed by integrating a number of essays collected from 13-year-old schoolchildren of the era, and developed into a coherent, yet comprehensive plot depicting everyday life and culture of 1980s early teenagers.

It was staged by Karusoo 1980 in the State Youth Theatre of the Estonian SSR. The text was born in course of repetitions. It was played at Klooga rand, a beach outside of Tallinn.

Foreshadowing 
The generation depicted — people born in late 1960s — were the last generation spending their youth in occupied Estonia, and the first generation to shape the post-occupation culture, life and eventually, policy. While most of the superficial trappings have been forgotten, changed or become memorables, several attitudes illustrated in the play are recognisable in Estonian public life of late 20th and early 21st century.

Common presentation 
(The primary roles, Andrus, Guido and Toomas, are named after them.) However, as a technically simple drama of strong recognition by teenagers of later decades, it, or episodes from it, has been presented by numerous non-notable school theatre projects.

Awards
As the director, Merle Karusoo was awarded by the award of the Theatre Union of the Estonian SSR (1980). The troupe got the collective special award of the Theatre Union.

In 1981, Merle Karusoo was awarded by the Literary Award of the Estonian SSR for the play.

Sources
 Olen 13-aastane

Further reading 
 Merle Karusoo 1989: Olen kolmeteistkümne aastane. Ühe etenduse lugu, 
 Piret Kruuspere July 2002: Merle Karusoo's Memory Theatre, published in Interlitteraria, number 7, 2002, pages 276–289
 Merle Karusoo Põhisuunda mittekuuluv

Estonian plays